Senator Crosby may refer to:

Charles F. Crosby (1847–1889), Wisconsin State Senate
Clarkson F. Crosby (1817–1858), New York State Senate
Darius Crosby (1760s–1818), New York State Senate
Elisha Oscar Crosby (1818–1895), California State Senate
John Crawford Crosby (1859–1943), Massachusetts State Senate
LaVon Crosby (1924–2016), Nebraska State Senate
Moreau S. Crosby (1839–1893), Michigan State Senate
Robert B. Crosby (1911–2000), Nebraska State Senate